Ekaterina Petukhova (born 16 June 1996) is a female diver from Russia. 

She competed at the 2015 World Aquatics Championships. She also competed at the 2016 Rio de Janeiro Summer Olympics.

See also
 Russia at the 2015 World Aquatics Championships
 Russia at the 2016 Summer Olympics

References

External links
http://www.the-sports.org/ekaterina-petukhova-diving-spf185343.html

Russian female divers
Living people
Place of birth missing (living people)
1996 births
Divers at the 2016 Summer Olympics
Olympic divers of Russia